The following is a list of the forty-nine legislative districts in the U.S. state of Washington following the 2022 redistricting. From the time Washington achieved statehood in 1889, it has elected members for representation to the state legislature.  Each district elects a state senator and two district representatives.  The districts have changed throughout state history through periodical redistricting, most recently in 2022 following the 2020 census. District lines in Washington are drawn by the Washington State Redistricting Commission, which is made up of four members appointed by the legislature's party leaders and a fifth non-voting chair.

Districts
Below is a gallery of forty-nine legislative districts of Washington as of the 2022 redistricting with counties each represents. Current members are listed at Washington State Senate and Washington House of Representatives.

See also
 Washington State Redistricting Commission
 Washington State Legislature
 Washington State Senate
 Washington House of Representatives

References

External links
 Washington State Redistricting Commission
 Washington House of Representatives
 Map of Legislative Districts

 
Washington State Legislature